Rodney Wilfred Heath (15 June 1884 – 26 October 1936) was an Australian tennis player.

Personal
Heath was the second son of F. W. Heath who was the official timekeeper at the Victorian Racing Club and Victorian Amateur Turf Club. Rodney's brother C. V. Heath won the South Australian men's singles title in 1902. In June 1915 Heath left Australia to join the Royal Flying Corps in England. He was promoted to the rank of major two years later. In 1916 Heath was injured when he crash-landed his plane after flying into a snowstorm en route from England to France.

Tennis career
Heath was the Men's Singles champion at the inaugural Australasian Championships in 1905 defeating Albert Curtis in four sets. He won again it five years later, in 1910, after a victory in the final against Horace Rice in three straight sets.

In 1911 he played in the Davis Cup challenge round in New Zealand against the United States and defeated William Larned in four sets.

In 1919 he reached the final of the Wimbledon Men's Doubles tournament with Randolph Lycett.

Death 
On 26 October 1936, 9 months before his 53rd birthday, Heath was found dead in the bedroom of his sister's home in Melbourne, Australia. It is said that Heath died from melanoma in his stomach.

Grand Slam finals

Singles

Doubles: 5 (3 titles, 2 runners-up)

References

External links
 
 
 
 

Australasian Championships (tennis) champions
Australian male tennis players
Place of birth missing
1884 births
1936 deaths
Grand Slam (tennis) champions in men's singles
Grand Slam (tennis) champions in men's doubles
Australian aviators
Tennis players from Melbourne
Australian military personnel of World War I
Military personnel from Melbourne
Royal Flying Corps personnel